IC 335 is an edge-on lenticular galaxy about 60 million light years (18 million parsecs) away, in the constellation Fornax. It is part of the Fornax Cluster.

IC 335 appears very similar to NGC 4452, a lenticular galaxy in Virgo. Both galaxies are edge-on, meaning that their characteristics, like spiral arms, are hidden. Lenticular galaxies like these are thought to be intermediate between spiral galaxies and elliptical galaxies, and like elliptical galaxies, they have very little gas for star formation. IC 335 may have once been a spiral galaxy that ran out of interstellar medium, or it may have collided with a galaxy in the past and thus used up all of its gas (see interacting galaxy).

References

External links
 

0335
13277
Fornax (constellation)
Fornax Cluster
Lenticular galaxies